The 1985–86 Nebraska Cornhuskers men's basketball team represented the University of Nebraska, Lincoln during the 1985–86 college basketball season. Led by head coach Moe Iba (6th season), the Cornhuskers competed in the Big Eight Conference and played their home games at the Bob Devaney Sports Center. They finished with a record of 19–11 overall and 8–6 in Big Eight Conference play. Nebraska fell to Iowa State in the semifinal round of the Big Eight tournament, but earned an at-large bid to the 1986 NCAA tournament – the first NCAA Tournament appearance in school history – as the No. 9 seed in the Southeast region. The Cornhuskers were beaten by No. 8 seed Western Kentucky in the opening round, 67–59.

Senior center Dave Hoppen was selected to the All-Big Eight team for the third time. Hoppen later had his No. 42 retired at Nebraska, and he remains the school's career leading in scoring with 2,167 points.

Roster

Schedule and results 

|-
!colspan=12 style=| Regular season

|-
!colspan=12 style=| Big Eight tournament

|-
!colspan=12 style=| NCAA Tournament

Rankings

Team players drafted into the NBA

References

Nebraska
Nebraska Cornhuskers men's basketball seasons
Corn
Corn
Nebraska